Greg Young may refer to:
 Greg Young (footballer) (born 1983), English footballer
 Greg Young (basketball), American basketball coach
 Greg Young (planner), Australian urban planner